Shankar Lamichhane (1928 – 1976) was a Nepalese essayist and short–story writer. He is best known for his Madan Puraskar–winning essay collection Abstract Chintan Pyaj.

Early life 
He was born on 17 March 1928 (5 Chaitra 1984 BS) to father Hari Prasad Lamichhane and mother Raj Kumari in Jaisidewal, Kathmandu. Due to poor condition of his parents, his mother decided to take him and his brother to Banaras. His brother died after reaching Banaras. His mother started working as a teacher in Banaras and raised him but she died about a decade later. Lamichhane then moved back to Kathmandu. Lamichhane completed I.Sc. from Tri-Chandra College in Kathmandu.

Literary career 
Considered one of Nepal's foremost essayists of all times, Shankar Lamichhane wrote with a lyrical, musical tempo, unrestrained by the ponderous language that often mars the essays of his elders, peers or followers. He died an untimely death at the age of 48, but had stopped writing before that, discouraged by an anonymous accusation of plagiarism, an accusation he accepted, but which is still deliberated over by critics. That Lamichhane's fresh, playful style greatly enriched Nepali literature is, however, indisputable. His collection Abstract Chintan: Pyaz shows off his light touch in dealing with both intimate and metaphysical subjects.

Notable Works 

 Abstract Chintan Pyaj (1967; essays anthology)
 Gaunthali ko Gund (Short stories)
 Godhuli Sansar (1970; Anthology of essays)
 Shankar Lamichhane ka Nibanadaharu (Anthology of essays)
 Bimba Pratibimba (Literary essays)
 Shankar Lamichhane Aatmakatha (Autobiography)

Awards and honours
He won the prestigious Madan Puraskar for his anthology of essays Abstract Chintan Pyaj. Shankar Lamichhane Essay Society was established in his honor.

Personal life and death 
He married Ratna Rai from Darjeeling. They had two children. He then remarried Subarna Shrestha, with whom he had two children. 

Lamichhane died on 24 January 1976 (10 Magh 2032 BS) at the age of 47.

See also 
 Lain Singh Bangdel
 Parijat 
 Bhupi Sherchan
 Laxmi Prasad Devkota

References

Nepali-language writers
Nepalese essayists
Madan Puraskar winners
20th-century Nepalese male writers
Tri-Chandra College alumni